Coleophora kolymella is a moth of the family Coleophoridae. It is found in southern Russia.

References

kolymella
Moths described in 1992
Moths of Europe